Good To Finally Know is Pete Francis' third studio album. It released in 2004, the same year as Dispatch's historic last concert. Good To Finally Know was similar in musical style to the artist's previous albums.

Track listing
Stars over the Country - 4:23
Ride a Tear - 4:41
Town on Top of Town - 4:32
Blueberries - 6:26
Air - 4:05
Low Sun - 4:38
Cracker Jack - 2:59
 All Eyes Look in - 5:00
 Good to Finally Know - 5:27
 Goin' Home - 1:05

Francis included a track, Town on Top of Town, on The Relief Project charity CD (a project run by Dispatch's very own Braddigan) in 2005.

Personnel
Pete Francis - vocals, acoustic guitar, electric guitar
Paul Tillitson - Hammond organ, clavinet, synthesizer, Wurlitzer, Mellotron
Tony Mason - drums, percussion
John Caban - electric guitars, acoustic guitar, lap steel guitar
Jesse Graham - bass
EE Cummings - sampled poem on "Good to Finally Know"

2004 albums
Pete Francis Heimbold albums